Homoeocera georginas is a moth of the subfamily Arctiinae. It is known only for a restricted area in Guatemala, on the Pacific slope, at high altitude.

The length of the forewings is 18–20 mm. The biology of this species is unknown.

Etymology
The name is a reference to the type locality: Fuentes Georginas, a popular spot with hot springs high in the mountains on the Pacific slope.

References

Euchromiina
Moths of Central America
Endemic fauna of Guatemala
Moths described in 2010